Kalyan Biswas (born 3 February 1937) is an Indian former cricketer. He played seven first-class matches for Bengal between 1955 and 1962.

See also
 List of Bengal cricketers

References

External links
 

1937 births
Living people
Indian cricketers
Bengal cricketers
Cricketers from Kolkata